|}

The Godolphin Stakes is a Listed flat horse race in Great Britain open to horses aged three years or older.
It is run at Newmarket over a distance of 1 mile and 4 furlongs (2,413 metres), and it is scheduled to take place each year in September.

Winners since 1987

See also
 Horse racing in Great Britain
 List of British flat horse races

References 
Racing Post: 

Flat races in Great Britain
Newmarket Racecourse
Open middle distance horse races